Gödəklər or Gëdaklar or Gyudaklyar or Kyudaklar may refer to:
Gödəklər, Beylagan, Azerbaijan
Gödəklər, Qubadli, Azerbaijan